Yang Zhifa (born 1933) is one of the discoverers of the Terracotta Army. For many years, he worked in a small souvenir shop within the museum of the Mausoleum of the First Qin Emperor, where he was signing books sold to the tourists.

Biography

Discovery 
On 23 March 1974, Yang Zhifa, 41 years old, living in Xiyang, a village of the Lintong county 35 kilometers (20 miles) east from the city of Xi'an, decided, in the middle of a drought, to dig a well with his five brothers — Yang Wenhai, Yang Yanxin, Yang Quanyi, Yang Peiyan and Yang Xinam — and Wang Puzhi to water their crops. They chose a small wooded area south of their village; five days later, the well reached 15 metres (50') in depth and, bringing up dirt, Zhifa found a terracotta head and a bronze arrowhead.

Rewards 
Immediately, he informed authorities of his discovery; they dispatched a team of archeologists to the site. The government offered him 300 yuan as a reward, equivalent to his annual salary. He was then evicted from his 167 square meters (1800 sq. ft.) of property with the other villagers for archeologic and touristic needs, but was granted land in Qinyong, a neighboring village. When the site became accessible to the public, he was hired by the museum, in which he signed books in a souvenir shop, six days a week, from 9 am to 5 pm, for a salary of CNY 300 per month, which increased to CNY 1000 after retirement.<ref name="Swissi S

Honors 
 In 1998, Yang Zhifa had the privilege of shaking President of the United States Bill Clinton's hand during the President's visit to China and the Mausoleum of the First Qin Emperor.
 Asteroid 267017 Yangzhifa, discovered by Italian amateur astronomer Silvano Casulli in 1995, was named in his honor. The official  was published by the Minor Planet Center on 5 October 2017.

References 
 

Qin dynasty
Archaeology of China
Chinese farmers
1933 births
Living people